Svoboda is a village in the Pazardzhik Province, Bulgaria. As of 2005 it has 218 inhabitants.
In Bulgarian its name means "freedom". A copper mine, Mina Radka is located at 5 km to the south.

Villages in Pazardzhik Province
Romani communities in Bulgaria